Damián Emilio Akerman (born March 25, 1980 in Morteros, Córdoba Province) is an Argentine football striker who currently plays for Deportivo Morón in the Primera B Nacional.

Nicknamed "El Cabro", Akerman began at the youth sector of club Newell's Old Boys. He made his debut in 2000 with Argentino de Rosario in the Primera B Metropolitana. In 2003, he relocated to Chile to play for first division club Deportes La Serena, but after five months he returned to Argentina and signed with Deportivo Morón, which he eventually would spend most of his career with.

After four stints at Morón, Akerman became the all-time leading scorer in the club's history with 141 goals altogether in both, second and third division. He also had a brief spell in the Argentine Primera with Gimnasia de La Plata in 2005. Moreover, he spent some time with Ferro Carril Oeste between 2006 and 2007. In July 2009, Akerman was loaned to Bolivian side Blooming. He made his debut in the Liga de Fútbol Profesional Boliviano on August 8, 2009 against Nacional Potosí. With the help of his goals in crucial games Blooming obtained the 2009 Clausura title, the first in his career. After a year in Bolivia, Akerman returned to Morón once again.

Club titles

References

External links 
 Argentine Primera statistics  
 BDFA profile 
 

1980 births
Living people
Sportspeople from Córdoba Province, Argentina
Argentine expatriate footballers
Argentine footballers
Association football forwards
Ferro Carril Oeste footballers
Deportivo Morón footballers
Club de Gimnasia y Esgrima La Plata footballers
Club Blooming players
Deportes La Serena footballers
Expatriate footballers in Bolivia
Expatriate footballers in Chile
Argentine expatriate sportspeople in Chile
Argentine expatriate sportspeople in Bolivia
Argentine people of German descent
Argentino de Rosario footballers